The Tampok is a right tributary of the river Lawa (the upper course of the Maroni) in western French Guiana.

References

Rivers of French Guiana
Rivers of France